Rum Creek is a stream in the U.S. state of Georgia. It is a tributary to the Ocmulgee River.

Rum Creek was named for the fact a sugarcane mill on its banks also distilled rum as a side business.

References

Rivers of Georgia (U.S. state)
Rivers of Monroe County, Georgia